Eotile, or Beti, is a nearly extinct Tano language of Ivory Coast. Speakers are shifting to Anyin, with remaining Eotile speakers heavily influenced by that language. The last speaker of "pure" Eotile is reported to have died in 1993.

References

Potou–Tano languages
Languages of Ivory Coast
Endangered Niger–Congo languages